Hellemmes is a former commune in the Nord department in northern France, since 1977 an associated part of Lille.

Heraldry

See also
Communes of the Nord department

References

Lille
Former communes of Nord (French department)